Live at Luther College is a live album by Dave Matthews and Tim Reynolds recorded at Luther College in Decorah, Iowa. Recorded on February 6, 1996, and released nearly three years later, it was the first concert recording by the pair to be made available commercially. The album features several previously unreleased or rare tracks, including "What Will Become of Me?", which would later be used as the basis for the song "Pantala Naga Pampa" on the 1998 studio album Before These Crowded Streets. Six songs would appear on the studio album Crash, released later in 1996.

Live at Luther College was followed eight years later by the duo's Live at Radio City.

Track listing
All songs by David J. Matthews unless noted.

Disc one
 "One Sweet World" – 5:43
 "#41" (Beauford, Lessard, Matthews, Moore, Tinsley) – 5:37
 "Tripping Billies" – 5:49
 "Jimi Thing/(What Will Become of Me?)" – 8:13
 "Satellite" – 4:39
 "Crash into Me" – 5:33
 "Deed is Done" (Beauford, Lessard, Matthews, Moore, Tinsley) – 4:51
 "Lover Lay Down" – 5:33
 "What Would You Say" – 5:06
 "Minarets" – 7:00
 "Cry Freedom" – 5:39
 "Dancing Nancies" – 7:15

Disc two
 "Typical Situation" – 7:02
 "Stream" (Reynolds) – 5:49
 "Warehouse" – 9:17
 "Christmas Song" – 5:24
 "Seek Up" – 7:43
 "Say Goodbye" – 5:19
 "Ants Marching" – 5:26
 "Little Thing" – 6:18
 "Halloween" – 3:00
 "Granny" – 3:22
 "Two Step" – 6:34

Personnel
Dave Matthews – acoustic guitar, vocals
Tim Reynolds – acoustic guitar

Charts

Weekly charts

Year-end charts

References

Albums produced by John Alagía
1999 live albums
Dave Matthews live albums
Tim Reynolds live albums
RCA Records live albums